Nenetta (minor planet designation: 289 Nenetta) is a typical A-type asteroid. It was discovered by Auguste Charlois on 10 March 1890 in Nice, France.

The spectrum of 289 Nenetta reveals the strong presence of the mineral Olivine, a relative rarity in the asteroid belt.

References

External links
 
 

Background asteroids
Nenetta
Nenetta
A-type asteroids (Tholen)
A-type asteroids (SMASS)
18900310